The 2016 American Boxing Olympic Qualification Tournament for the boxing tournament at the 2016 Summer Olympics in Rio de Janeiro Brazil was held in Buenos Aires, Argentina from March 11 to March 19, 2016. A total of 241 boxers from 35 countries competed.

Medalists

Men

Women

Qualification summary

Results

Men

Light flyweight (49 kg)
The two finalists will qualify to the 2016 Summer Olympics.

Flyweight (52 kg)
The two finalists will qualify to the 2016 Summer Olympics.

Bantamweight (56 kg)
The two finalists will qualify to the 2016 Summer Olympics.

Lightweight (60 kg)
The top three boxers will qualify to the 2016 Summer Olympics.

Light welterweight (64 kg)
The two finalists will qualify to the 2016 Summer Olympics.

Welterweight (69 kg)
The top three boxers will qualify to the 2016 Summer Olympics.

Middleweight (75 kg)
The top three boxers will qualify to the 2016 Summer Olympics.

Light heavyweight (81 kg)
The two finalists will qualify to the 2016 Summer Olympics.

Heavyweight (91 kg)
The top three boxers will qualify to the 2016 Summer Olympics.

Super heavyweight (+91 kg)
The top three boxers will qualify to the 2016 Summer Olympics.

Women

Flyweight (51 kg)
The two finalists will qualify to the 2016 Summer Olympics.

Lightweight (60 kg)
The winner will qualify to the 2016 Summer Olympics.

Middleweight (75 kg)
The two finalists will qualify to the 2016 Summer Olympics.

References

Boxing Olympic Qualification Americas
Boxing qualification for the 2016 Summer Olympics
 Sports competitions in Buenos Aires
American Boxing